Sing Parunchai (สิงห์ พรัญชัย) is a Thai Muay Thai fighter.

Biography

Sing became notable on the Muay Thai scene in 2014 when he won the 112 lbs Channel 7 Stadium belt. Next year Sing's winning streak at Channel 7 reached the symbolic number of 7 which saw him granted the coveted Channel 7 jacket. He was also awarded the title of Fighter of the Year.

Sing retired from competition in 2019 and is serving as a police officer.

Titles and accomplishments

Professional Boxing Association of Thailand (PAT) 
 2017 Thailand Featherweight Champion (1 defense)
Channel 7 Stadium
 2014 Channel 7 Stadium 112 lbs Champion
 2015 Channel 7 Stadium Fighter of the Year

Fight record

|-  style="background:#fbb;"
| 2019-07-09|| Loss ||align=left| Kongthoranee Sor.Sommai || Lumpinee Stadium ||Bangkok, Thailand || KO (Left high kick) || 2 ||
|-  style="background:#fbb;"
| 2019-05-29|| Loss ||align=left| Klasuk Phetjinda || Rajadamnern Stadium  || Bangkok, Thailand || TKO (Doctor Stoppage) || 3 ||
|-  style="background:#fbb;"
| 2019-03-31|| Loss ||align=left| Dechsakda Phukongyadsuebudomsuk || Channel 7 Stadium  || Bangkok, Thailand || KO (Elbows) || 3 ||
|-  style="background:#fbb;"
| 2018-12-07|| Loss ||align=left| Messi Pangkongprap || Lumpinee Stadium 62nd Birthday  || Bangkok, Thailand || KO (3 Knockdowns/Elbow) || 2 || 
|-
! style=background:white colspan=9 |
|-  style="background:#cfc;"
| 2018-10-28|| Win ||align=left| Wayunoi SuperMuay || Channel 7 Stadium || Bangkok, Thailand || KO || 1 ||
|-  style="background:#cfc;"
| 2018-09-07|| Win ||align=left| Samsing Por.Peenapat || Lumpinee Stadium || Bangkok, Thailand || Decision || 5 || 3:00
|-
! style=background:white colspan=9 |
|-  style="background:#fbb;"
| 2018-03-28|| Loss||align=left| Mongkolchai Kwaitonggym || WanParunchai + Poonseua Sanjorn || Nakhon Si Thammarat, Thailand || Decision || 5 || 3:00

|-  style="background:#cfc;"
| 2018-02-10 || Win ||align=left| Christian Hyatt || Topking World Series 17 || Guang'an, China || KO (Knee)|| 3 ||
|-  style="background:#cfc;"
| 2017-12-19|| Win ||align=left| Sprinter Pangkongprap || Lumpinee Stadium || Bangkok, Thailand || Decision || 5 || 3:00
|-
! style=background:white colspan=9 |
|-  style="background:#cfc;"
| 2017-11-04|| Win ||align=left| Sakunchailek VeronaFarm || Lumpinee Stadium || Bangkok, Thailand || KO || 1 ||
|-  style="background:#fbb;"
| 2017-09-10|| Loss ||align=left| Sakunchailek VeronaFarm || Samui Fight 2017 + Kiatpetch || Ko Samui, Thailand || Decision || 5 || 3:00
|-  style="background:#fbb;"
| 2017-08-08|| Loss ||align=left| Sprinter Pangkongprap || Lumpinee Stadium || Bangkok, Thailand || Decision || 5 || 3:00
|-  style="background:#cfc;"
| 2017-05-05|| Win ||align=left| Khunsuknoi Sitkaewprapol || Lumpinee Stadium || Bangkok, Thailand || TKO (Knees) || 4 ||
|-  style="background:#fbb;"
| 2016-12-09|| Loss ||align=left| Petchdam Petchyindee Academy || Lumpinee Stadium || Bangkok, Thailand || KO (Left elbow)|| 4 ||
|-  style="background:#fbb;"
| 2016-11-14|| Loss ||align=left| Petchdam Petchyindee Academy || Rajadamnern Stadium || Bangkok, Thailand || Decision || 5 || 3:00
|-  style="background:#cfc;"
| 2016-09-30|| Win ||align=left| Prajanchai P.K.Saenchaimuaythaigym || Lumpinee Stadium || Bangkok, Thailand || Decision || 5 || 3:00
|-  style="background:#cfc;"
| 2016-08-30|| Win ||align=left| Yodmongkol Muangseema|| Lumpinee Stadium || Bangkok, Thailand || Decision || 5 || 3:00
|-  style="background:#fbb;"
| 2016-07-21|| Loss ||align=left| Prajanchai P.K.Saenchaimuaythaigym || Rajadamnern Stadium || Bangkok, Thailand || Decision || 5 || 3:00
|-  style="background:#cfc;" 
| 2016-05-10|| Win ||align=left| Methee Sor.Jor.ToiPaedriew || Lumpinee Stadium || Bangkok, Thailand || Decision || 5 || 3:00
|-  style="background:#cfc;"
| 2016-03-28|| Win ||align=left| Petch Sawansrangmunja || || Nakhon Si Thammarat, Thailand || Decision || 5 || 3:00
|-  style="background:#cfc;"
| 2016-03-04|| Win ||align=left| Sprinter Pangkongprap || Lumpinee Stadium || Bangkok, Thailand || Decision || 5 || 3:00
|-  style="background:#cfc;"
| 2016-01-23|| Win ||align=left| Kaokarat Jitmuangonon  ||  || Bangkok, Thailand || KO || 4 ||
|-  style="background:#cfc;"
| 2015-09-11|| Win ||align=left| Sprinter Pangkongprap|| Lumpinee Stadium || Bangkok, Thailand || Decision || 5 || 3:00
|-  style="background:#cfc;"
| 2015-08-09|| Win ||align=left| Kaokarat Jitmuangnon || Channel 7 Stadium || Bangkok, Thailand || KO || 3 ||
|-  style="background:#cfc;"
| 2015-07-12|| Win ||align=left| Superjeng Por.Phinabhat || Channel 7 Stadium || Bangkok, Thailand || KO (Punches) || 3 ||
|-  style="background:#cfc;"
| 2015-05-31|| Win ||align=left| Fahmai Sor.Sommai || Channel 7 Stadium || Bangkok, Thailand || KO (Punches) || 3 ||
|-  style="background:#cfc;"
| 2015-04-12|| Win ||align=left| Chokprecha Sitnayoktaweep || Channel 7 Stadium || Bangkok, Thailand || KO (Right high kick) || 3 ||
|-  style="background:#cfc;"
| 2015-02-03|| Win ||align=left| Kaokarat Jitmuangnon || Lumpinee Stadium || Bangkok, Thailand || Decision || 5 || 3:00
|-  style="background:#cfc;"
| 2014-12-28|| Win ||align=left| Phetprayakrai PK.SaenchaiMuayThaiGym || Channel 7 Stadium || Bangkok, Thailand || Decision || 5 || 3:00
|-  style="background:#cfc;"
| 2014-11-02|| Win ||align=left| Chamuakphet Jitmuangnon || Channel 7 Stadium || Bangkok, Thailand || Decision || 5 || 3:00
|-  style="background:#cfc;"
| 2014-07-20|| Win ||align=left| Kumason Lukhaonanai || Channel 7 Stadium || Bangkok, Thailand || KO || 2 || 
|-
! style=background:white colspan=9 |
|-  style="background:#cfc;"
| 2014-04-06|| Win ||align=left| Keng Jitmuangnon || Channel 7 Stadium || Bangkok, Thailand || Decision || 5 || 3:00
|-
| colspan=9 | Legend:

References

Sing Parunchai
Living people
1995 births